|}
The Montenegro women's national handball team is the national team of Montenegro. It is governed by the Handball Federation of Montenegro and takes part in international handball competitions.

History

Montenegro's women's national handball team was formed in 2006, shortly after Montenegro gained independence. It was founded upon ŽRK Budućnost Podgorica, a club with numerous European trophies, which produced many famous Montenegrin players.

2006–2011
Montenegro has been playing in official competitions since 2006. They played for the first time during the qualifying tournament for the 2007 World Women's Handball Championship in Cheb, where they finished second with four wins and one defeat. A year later, Montenegro did not qualify for the 2008 European Women's Handball Championship after a defeat in the playoffs against Croatia. The same result occurred at qualifiers for the 2009 World Women's Handball Championship in China, as Montenegro lost to Sweden in the playoffs.

Montenegro's first significant success came in 2010. After passing the qualifiers without any defeats, the team participated in the 2010 European Women's Handball Championship in Denmark and Norway. Montenegro finished in sixth place, with 46 goals from Montenegro's Bojana Popović.

For the first time, Montenegro played at the IHF World Women's Handball Championship in 2011. After passing the group stage, Montenegro was eliminated by Spain in the round of 16.

Olympic silver and European gold (2012)
On 11 August 2012, Montenegro won a silver medal at the 2012 Summer Olympics in London. On 16 December 2012, they became champions at the 2012 European Women's Handball Championship in Belgrade.

At the 2012 Summer Olympics, Montenegro passed the group round with two defeats but won elimination matches against France and Spain. In the final match, Montenegro was defeated by Norway 23–26. With their second place title, Montenegro won the first Olympic medal for Montenegro since their country became independent. Bojana Popović and Katarina Bulatović were prominent players on the team during this tournament.

At the 2012 European Women's Handball Championship in Serbia, Montenegro won its first title at a major handball championship. In the semi-finals, Montenegro defeated Serbia 27–26. In the finals, Montenegro defeated Norway 34–31, winning the championship. The players Katarina Bulatović and Jovanka Radičević played significant roles in the team's victory. With 56 goals, Bulatović was the top scorer of the championship.

Montenegro won both medals, in London and in Belgrade, with head coach Dragan Adžić.

2013–present
After two successes in 2012, Montenegro was eliminated by Denmark in the round of 16 at the 2013 World Women's Handball Championship.

Montenegro did well in the 2014 European Women's Handball Championship. After making it to the semi-finals, the team was defeated by Spain. In the end, Montenegro finished in fourth place.

Montenegro made significant strides in the 2015 World Women's Handball Championship. After a notable win against Hungary 32–15, Montenegro eliminated Angola in the round of 16. However, in the quarterfinals, Norway defeated Montenegro 26–25. That was the first performance of Montenegro in the quarterfinals of a World Women's Handball Championship.

At their second appearance in the Summer Olympics, Montenegro did not perform as well, in the 2016 Rio de Janeiro Olympics. With five defeats during the group stage, Montenegro finished in nearly last place.

After the Olympics, Montenegro made big changes to the team and recruited many new young players produced by ŽRK Budućnost. The first main competition for the newly formed team was at the 2016 European Women's Handball Championship, where Montenegro had the youngest team. With one win and two defeats, the team finished in 13th place.

In November 2017, The Handball Federation of Montenegro stated that the new head coach of the national team would be Per Johansson instead of Dragan Adžić, who had served the team for seven years. As a coach, Adžić led Montenegro to nine big international competitions, winning gold during the 2012 European Championship and silver during the Summer Olympics the same year.

With a new head coach, Montenegro finished sixth in the 2017 World Women's Handball Championship, with equal wins and losses, 3–1–3. The next year, they played at the 2018 European Women's Handball Championship in France but did not succeed. After six games, Montenegro finished the tournament in ninth place.

Competitive record
The Montenegrin national team has participated in many international competitions, including the Summer Olympics, World Championship and European Championship.

Olympic Games
Montenegro has participated in two Summer Olympics (2012 and 2016). In 2012, the women's handball team won the first Olympic medal for Montenegro since their independence.

World Championship
Montenegro has participated in six World Championships. After failing to qualify for championships 2007 and 2009, they have participated in six consecutive tournaments. The best results Montenegro had were in 2015 and 2017, when they played in the quarterfinals.

European Championship
Montenegro has participated in seven European Championships. After having failed to qualify for the European Championship 2008, they have participated in all subsequent tournaments. Montenegro was the European champion in 2012, the bronze medalist in 2022 when was a co-host along with Slovenia and North Macedonia, and a semi-finalist in 2014.

Team

Current squad
Squad for a training camp in Podgorica on 27 February to 3 March 2023.

Head coach: Bojana Popović

Current staff
  Head Coach: Bojana Popović
  Assistant Coach: Maja Savić
  Fitness Coach: Danica Delić
  Goalkeeping Coach: Mirjana Milenković
  Physiotherapist: Andrija Damjanović
  Physiotherapist: Mitar Vujović
  Physiotherapist: Anđelka Lekić
  Head of Delegation: Arijan Efović

Head coaches
Since independence, Montenegro has been led by six different coaches. During the first years, the head coach was Nikola Petrović. After Petrović, Montenegro was led by Gyula Zsiga and then by Dragan Adžić, who was the most successful head coach.

* Data are only for official matches (qualifiers, European Championship, World Championship, Olympic Games).

Notable former players

Bojana Popović 
Dragica Orlandić 
Maja Savić
Aida Dorović
Gabriella Markoč
Sanja Jovović
Radmila Petrovic
Marija Jovanović
Ana Đokić
Sonja Barjaktarović 
Anđela Bulatović
Suzana Lazović
Ana Radović
Katarina Bulatović
Majda Mehmedović
Jovanka Radičević

Record against opponents

Since independence, Montenegro played official games against 38 different teams. The only national team against which Montenegro has never played is Brazil. Below is the list of the performances of Montenegro national handball team against every single opponent.

Last update: April 2019.

See also
Montenegro men's national handball team

References

External links

IHF profile

Women's national handball teams
National team
H